Argus or Argos Panoptes ("All-seeing Argos") is a many-eyed giant in Greek mythology.

Mythology 

Argus Panoptes was the guardian of the heifer-nymph Io and the son of Arestor. According to Asclepiades, Argus Panoptes was a son of Inachus, and according to Cercops he was a son of Argus and Ismene, daughter of Asopus. Acusilaus says that he was earth-born (authochthon), born from Gaia. Probably Mycene (in another version the son of Gaia) was a primordial giant whose epithet Panoptes, "all-seeing", led to his being described with multiple, often one hundred eyes. The epithet Panoptes was applied to the god of the Sun, Helios, and was taken up as an epithet by Zeus, Zeus Panoptes. "In a way," Walter Burkert observes, "the power and order of Argos the city are embodied in Argos the neatherd, lord of the herd and lord of the land, whose name itself is the name of the land."The epithet Panoptes, reflecting his mythic role, set by Hera as a very effective watchman of Io, was described in a fragment of a lost poem Aigimios, attributed to Hesiod:

In the 5th century and later, Argus' wakeful alertness was explained for an increasingly literal culture as his having so many eyes that only a few of the eyes would sleep at a time: there were always eyes still awake. In the 2nd century AD Pausanias noted at Argos, in the temple of Zeus Larissaios, an archaic image of Zeus with a third eye in the center of his forehead, allegedly Priam's Zeus Herkeios purloined from Troy.

Argus was Hera's servant. His great service to the Olympian pantheon was to slay the chthonic serpent-legged monster Echidna as she slept in her cave. Hera's defining task for Argus was to guard the white heifer Io from Zeus, who was attracted to her, keeping her chained to the sacred olive tree at the Argive Heraion. She required someone who had at least a hundred eyes spread out, always watching in all directions, someone who would stay awake despite being asleep. Argos was meant to be the perfect guardian. She charged him to "Tether this cow safely to an olive-tree at Nemea". Hera knew that the heifer was in reality Io, one of the many nymphs Zeus was coupling with to establish a new order. To free Io, Zeus had Argus slain by Hermes. The messenger of the Olympian gods, disguised as a shepherd, first put all of Argus' eyes asleep with spoken charms, then slew him by hitting him with a stone, the first stain of bloodshed among the new generation of gods. After beheading Argus, Hermes acquired the epithet Argeiphontes or “Argus-slayer”.

The sacrifice of Argus liberated Io and allowed her to wander the earth, although tormented by a gadfly sent by Hera, until she reached the Ionian Sea, named after her, from where she swam to Egypt and gave birth to a love child of Zeus, according to some versions of the myth.

According to Ovid, Argus had a hundred eyes. Hera had Argus' hundred eyes preserved forever in a peacock's tail so as to immortalise her faithful watchman. In another version, Hera transformed the whole of Argus into a peacock.

The myth makes the closest connection of Argus, the neatherd, with the bull. According to the mythographer Apollodorus, Argus, "being exceedingly strong ... killed the bull that ravaged Arcadia and clad himself in its hide".

Eponyms 
Argus Panoptes is referenced in the scientific names of at least eight animals, each of which bears a pattern of eye spots: reptiles Cnemaspis argus, Eremias argus, Sibon argus, Sphaerodactylus argus, and the Argus monitor Varanus panoptes; the pheasant Argusianus argus; the fish Cephalopholis argus and the cowry Arestorides argus.

Gallery

Argus, Io and Hermes

See also

Notes

References 
 Apollodorus, Apollodorus, The Library, with an English Translation by Sir James George Frazer, F.B.A., F.R.S. in 2 Volumes. Cambridge, Massachusetts, Harvard University Press; London, William Heinemann Ltd. 1921. . Online version at the Perseus Digital Library.
 Apollonius of Rhodes, Argonautica, edited and translated by William H. Race, Loeb Classical Library No. 1, Cambridge, Massachusetts, Harvard University Press, 2009. . Online version at Harvard University Press.
 Fowler, R. L. (2013), Early Greek Mythography: Volume 2: Commentary, Oxford University Press, 2013. .
 Impelluso, Lucia, Gods and Heroes in Art, Getty Publications, 2003. 
 Ovid, Metamorphoses, Brookes More, Boston, Cornhill Publishing Co. 1922. Online version at the Perseus Digital Library.
 Pausanias, Pausanias Description of Greece with an English Translation by W.H.S. Jones, Litt.D., and H.A. Ormerod, M.A., in 4 Volumes. Cambridge, MA, Harvard University Press; London, William Heinemann Ltd. 1918. Online version at the Perseus Digital Library.
 Tortel C., (2019), Sacralisé, diabolisé: le paon dans les religions de l'Asie à la Méditerranée, Geuthner, 2019. .
 West, M. L., Greek Epic Fragments: From the Seventh to the Fifth Centuries BC. Edited and translated by Martin L. West. Loeb Classical Library No. 497. Cambridge, Massachusetts: Harvard University Press, 2003. Online version at Harvard University Press.

External links 

 Warburg Institute Iconographic Database (c. 250 images of Io and Argus) 

Autochthons of classical mythology
Children of Inachus
Greek giants
Greek legendary creatures
Legendary creatures with supernumerary body parts
Deeds of Hermes
Metamorphoses characters
Monsters in Greek mythology
Argive characters in Greek mythology
Arcadian mythology
Eyes in culture
Metamorphoses into birds in Greek mythology
Deeds of Hera